The Parc botanique de Launay (90 hectares), sometimes known as the Parc botanique d'Orsay or the Parc de l'Université Paris XI, is a botanical garden located on the Université Paris-Sud XI campus at 3 rue Georges-Clemenceau, Orsay, Essonne, Île-de-France, France, and open daily; admission is free.

See also 
 List of botanical gardens in France

References 
 Flore virtuelle d'Orsay
 BGCI entry
 Balado: Parc botanique de Launay
 Tourisme Essonne entry (French)
 Culture.fr entry (French)

Launay, Parc botanique de
Launay, Parc botanique de